Barclays Bank, Market Place, Saffron Walden, Essex, England has been designated a Grade II* listed building by Historic England.
It was first listed in 1972.

It was built in 1874 for George Stacey Gibson, sole proprietor of the Saffron Walden and North Essex Bank, and designed by William Eden Nesfield. It is now a branch of Barclays Bank.

References

Grade II* listed buildings in Essex
Saffron Walden
Barclays